The Proclamation is an album by American jazz saxophonist Kamasi Washington.

Track listing
Based on:
The Conception	– 15:35
The Bombshell's Waltz – 12:01	
Fair As Equal – 8:32
Whacha Say – 4:56
The Rhythm Changes – 8:34
Lonely Woman –	11:19
Like Someone In Love – 7:06
Bobby Boom Dap – 10:50

Track 6 is a cover of Ornette Coleman, while track 7 is a cover of Jimmy Van Heusen and Johnny Burke.

Personnel
Based on:
Tenor saxophone – Kamasi Washington
Acoustic bass – Miles Mosley
Drums – Ronald Bruner Jr., Tony Austin
Electric bass – Stephen Bruner
Keyboards – Brandon Coleman
Piano – Cameron Graves
Trombone – Ryan Porter
Vocals – Patrice Quinn

References

External links
 
YouTube version of album

2007 albums
Kamasi Washington albums